Kenny Hendrick (born September 10, 1969) is an American stock car racing driver. He is a former competitor in the NASCAR Nationwide Series and Craftsman Truck Series. He is the twin brother of former USAC midget car driver Kara Hendrick, who lost her life in a racing accident in October 1991.

Busch Series
Hendrick made his Busch Series debut in 2003, when he ran a hodgepodge of entries. He made his debut at Gateway, where he started 30th for the Stanton Barrett Racing operation. He ran a solid race and came home 21st. He did a start and park race for GIC-Mixon Motorsports at Nazareth, before doing another start and park at Dover for Rick Allen. Hendrick would return then to the Stanton Barrett Racing for two more 2003 races. He was 35th at Nashville and 27th at Kentucky.

Hendrick was tapped to drive the first Keller Racing vehicles in 2004, a team that ran a ten-race schedule. The new team struggled. Hendrick only qualified for six races and his best finish was an 18th at Kentucky. The Kentucky race was the only one that Hendrick finished. He was released, and he would only compete in one more series race. It, too, came in 2004, when he drove the Ware Racing Enterprises Dodge to a 42nd-place finish in the fall Dover race.

He returned in 2008 at Mexico driving a second Stanton Barrett Motorsports car in place of Stan Barrett who was originally meant to race for the team. He qualified and finished 38th after pulling in with handling issues. He then drove at Richmond replacing the injured Larry Gunselman at MSRP Motorsports qualifying 40th and finishing 43rd after parking the car on lap 6. He made a second start for Stanton Barrett at Darlington starting 34th and finishing 36th after parking on lap 30.

In 2009, Hendrick drove for Smith-Ganassi Racing, a team that had bought the assets of the shut-down No. 40 team.

Craftsman Truck Series
Hendrick ran four Craftsman Truck Series races in 1996 to start his career off. He started his career with a top-10 start: a 9th in his debut at Phoenix. He finished 28th in that race. His best run of the year was a modest 23rd-place finish at Las Vegas.

Four more races were in store for Hendrick. He had one top-20 finish. That was a 19th at Texas, racing for Rob Rizzo. He had started the year off with the team, but after finishes of 29th and 24th, they let him go.

Hendrick would not race in this series until 2003, when he did a start and park effort in a second Billy Ballew Motorsports No. 9 entry. Because of the nature of the effort, Hendrick did not complete any of the dozen starts he did and his best finish was a 31st at IRP, where he also recorded his second career top-10 start of 10th.

Hendrick returned to the Trucks when he ran at Kansas Speedway in the No. 16 Xpress Motorsports truck on April 28, 2007.

Motorsports career results

SCCA National Championship Runoffs

NASCAR
(key) (Bold - Pole position awarded by qualifying time. Italics - Pole position earned by points standings or practice time. * – Most laps led.)

Nextel Cup Series

Busch Series

Craftsman Truck Series

References

External links
 

Living people
1969 births
People from Chino, California
Racing drivers from California
NASCAR drivers
Trans-Am Series drivers
SCCA National Championship Runoffs winners
Chip Ganassi Racing drivers